Mikael Gerdén (born 1 October 1976, in Stockholm) is a retired professional Swedish ice hockey goaltender.

He played three season in the Swedish Elite League for Färjestads BK between 2000 and 2003. During that period, he won one Swedish Championship and two runners-up medals. He signed with Kaufbeuren in 2003 when he left Färjestad. But only after one season with them he moved back home and played one season with Skå IK, in the fourth highest league, before he retired from ice hockey.

External links 
 Stat's at EliteProspects.com

1976 births
Living people
Ice hockey people from Stockholm
Huddinge IK players
Swedish ice hockey goaltenders
Swedish expatriate ice hockey players in Germany
Färjestad BK players